Jean Nehr (12 June 1929 – 2 January 2023) was a French actor.

Biography
Jean Nehr died in Aix-en-Provence on 2 January 2023, at the age of 93.

Filmography

Television
 (1967)
The Aeronauts (1969)
 (1974)
The Investigations of Commissioner Maigret (1978)
Les Coeurs brûlés (1992)
 (1996)
Le Miroir de l'eau (2004)
Plus belle la vie: season 1 (2005)
 (2006)
 (2009)
: season 3 (2010)
Caïn: season 1 (2012)
Caïn: season 3 (2015)
 (2017)
Plus belle la vie: season 16 (2020)

Telefilms
The Investigations of Commissioner Maigret (1979)
 (1981–1987)
 (1992)
 (1997)
 (2004)
 (2004)
 (2006)
 (2016)
 (2017)

Cinema
 (1989)
Hercule et Sherlock (1996)
Summer of '62 (2007)
Marseille (2016)

References

1929 births
2023 deaths
French actors
People from Douai